is a city in Osaka Prefecture, Japan. The city was founded on October 15, 1936.

Geography

Climate
Toyonaka has a Humid subtropical climate (Köppen Cfa) characterized by warm summers and cool winters with light to no snowfall.

Neighboring municipalities
Osaka Prefecture
Yodogawa-ku, Osaka
 Suita
 Minoh
 Ikeda
Hyōgo Prefecture
Amagasaki
Itami

Demographics
, the city has an estimated population of 396,014 and a population density of 11,000 persons per km². The total area is 36.38 km². Its peak population was over 420,000.

Toyonaka is a residential area of Osaka Prefecture, and includes Senri New Town.

The city is easy to reach through various modes of transportation, and many of its residents commute daily into Osaka City to work.
Osaka University and Osaka Music College have their campuses in Toyonaka.

The Harada Shinto shrine is located in Toyonaka, adjacent to the Hankyu Okamachi station. Founded during the reign of the Emperor Tenmu (672-686), the wooden shrine was rebuilt in 1652 and again in 1781.  An important cultural property, it is known for its copse of camphor trees and it is the site of the popular Lion Festival each October.

The Consulate-General of Russia in Osaka is located in Toyonaka.

Transportation
Osaka International Airport is partially located in Toyonaka including its terminal, although it is more commonly associated with the city of Itami.

The city is served by the Osaka Monorail (Senri-Chūō Station, Shōji Station, Shibahara Station, Hotarugaike Station and Osaka Airport Station), the Kita-Osaka Kyūkō Railway (Senri-Chūō Station and Ryokuchi-kōen Station) and the Hankyu Takarazuka Line (Shōnai Station, Hattori-tenjin Station, Sone Station, Okamachi Station, Toyonaka Station and Hotarugaike Station). It is the second-largest city in Japan to lack service by any JR company, after Toyota.

Hankyu bus provides local bus service throughout Toyonaka and into neighboring cities. Most services connect with railway stations, especially Senri Chuo and Toyonaka. Some medium- and long-distance highway bus services are available from Senri Chuo and Osaka Airport.

Points of interest
 Hattori Ryokuchi Arboretum
 Hattori Ryokuchi Park
 Osaka University
 Open-Air Museum of Old Japanese Farm Houses

Sister cities
  San Mateo, California, United States

Notable people
Shōzō Endō - comedian
Takashi Fujii - television performer
Mai Hosho - actress 
Tak Matsumoto - musician and guitarist (B'z)
Yoshihiro Murai - governor of Miyagi prefecture (2005–present)
Yukie Nishimura - pianist and composer
Masashi Oguro - soccer player
Panchan Rina - kickboxer
Kaoru Shintani - manga artist
Sanshiro Takagi - professional wrestler
Naoki Tanaka - comedian
Naoki Tanizaki - professional wrestler
Osamu Tezuka - manga artist and animator
Hitomi Yaida - singer and songwriter
Unagi Sayaka - professional wrestler

References

External links

  

Cities in Osaka Prefecture